Travis Lyle Diener (born March 1, 1982) is an American-Italian former professional basketball player who last played for Vanoli Cremona in the Italian Lega Basket Serie A (LBA). He also holds Italian citizenship, and has played for the Italian national team at EuroBasket 2013.

Career
Diener played collegiately at Marquette University, and was a member of the Golden Eagles team that reached the NCAA Tournament Final Four in 2003. Diener was one of three future NBA players from that Golden Eagles team; the others were Dwyane Wade and Steve Novak.

Following his college career at Marquette, he was a second-round draft choice (38th overall) of the Orlando Magic in the 2005 NBA Draft.

Diener made his NBA debut on December 2, 2005, playing 12 minutes and scoring three points in a loss against the Memphis Grizzlies.

On June 19, 2007, the Indiana Pacers signed Diener (who was a free agent) to a three-year deal reportedly worth $4.86 million.

On July 6, 2009, Diener exercised his player option to remain with the Pacers for the 2009-10 NBA season. He was waived by Indiana and signed by the Portland Trail Blazers in March 2010.

In August 2010, he was signed by Dinamo Sassari of the Italian Lega Basket Serie A.

In May 2013, he acquired Italian citizenship through his wife, who is of Italian descent. This allowed him to join the Italian national basketball team.

In 2014, Diener retired from professional basketball, after which he became director of player personnel at Marquette University. His jersey number 12 was retired by Dinamo Sassari.

In July 2017, Diener came out of retirement to sign with Vanoli Cremona. He re-signed with the club in July 2018.

The Basketball Tournament
Diener has played for Golden Eagles (a team primarily consisting of Marquette alumni) in The Basketball Tournament (TBT), an annual single-elimination winner-take-all tournament. In five games of TBT 2018, he averaged 8.6 points, 4.2 assists, and shot 43 percent from the field. Golden Eagles reached the semi-finals before falling to the eventual champions, Overseas Elite.  Diener rejoined the Marquette alumni team for the "Championship Weekend" of TBT 2019, hitting the deciding three-pointer of a semi-final win over Team Hines, before Golden Eagles fell to Carmen's Crew (a team primarily consisting of Ohio State alumni) in the final. In TBT 2020, he again joined Golden Eagles for its final contests. During the championship game against Sideline Cancer, Diener made one basket, the winning three-pointer that clinched the championship for Golden Eagles, along with the tournament's $1 million prize.

Career statistics

NBA regular season

|-
| style="text-align:left;"| 
| style="text-align:left;"| Orlando
| 23 || 0 || 10.7 || .420 || .439 || .833 || .9 || .7 || .3 || .0 || 3.8
|-
| style="text-align:left;"| 
| style="text-align:left;"| Orlando
| 26 || 0 || 11.1 || .425 || .360 || .800 || .7 || 1.3 || .2 || .0 || 3.8
|-
| style="text-align:left;"| 
| style="text-align:left;"| Indiana
| 66 || 21 || 20.5 || .370 || .318 || .901 || 1.7 || 3.8 || .5 || .1 || 6.9
|-
| style="text-align:left;"| 
| style="text-align:left;"| Indiana
| 55 || 0 || 13.1 || .413 || .390 || .800 || 1.6 || 2.2 || .5 || .1 || 3.7
|-
| style="text-align:left;"| 
| style="text-align:left;"| Indiana
| 4 || 0 || 6.3 || .167 || .200 || .000 || .5 || 1.0 || .8 || .0 || .8
|-
| style="text-align:left;"| 
| style="text-align:left;"| Portland
| 5 || 0 || 5.2 || .250 || .200 || .500 || .2 || .8 || .2 || .0 || .6
|- class="sortbottom"
| style="text-align:center;" colspan="2"| Career
| 179 || 21 || 14.9 || .388 || .353 || .847 || 1.4 || 2.4 || .4 || .1 || 4.8

NBA Playoffs

|-
| style="text-align:left;"| 2010
| style="text-align:left;"| Portland
| 2 || 0 || 3.5 || .000 || .000 || .000 || .0 || 1.0 || .0 || .0 || .0
|- class="sortbottom"
| style="text-align:center;" colspan="2"| Career
| 2 || 0 || 3.5 || .000 || .000 || .000 || .0 || 1.0 || .0 || .0 || .0

EuroCup

|-
| style="text-align:left;"| 2012–13
| style="text-align:left;" rowspan=2| Dinamo Sassari
| 6 || 6 || 33.1 || .430 || .382 || .769 || 1.7 || 8.5 || .8 || .0 || 15.2 || 17.8
|-
| style="text-align:left;"| 2013–14
| 14 || 8 || 26.1 || .370 || .333 || 1.000 || 2.0 || 5.9 || 1.0 || .0 || 7.8 || 11.4
|- class="sortbottom"
| style="text-align:left;"| Career
| style="text-align:left;"|
| 20 || 14 || 28.4 || .396 || .352 || .875 || 1.9 || 6.7 || 1.0 || .0 || 10.0 || 13.3

Domestic leagues

|-
| style="text-align:left;"| 2010–11
| style="text-align:left;" rowspan=4| Dinamo Sassari
| 28 || 28 || 31.7 || 13.2 || .475 || .367 || .812 || 3.5 || 4.6 || .0 || 1.2 || 2.5 
|-
| style="text-align:left;"| 2011–12
| 29 || 29 || 32.9 || 14.4 || .503 || .417 || .794 || 3.2 || 5.5 || .0 || 1.1 || 2.7
|-
| style="text-align:left;"| 2012–13
| 29 || 29 || 34.1 || 17.2 || .524 || .397 || .845 || 2.9 || 7.5 || .0 || 1.4 || 2.4
|-
| style="text-align:left;"| 2013–14
| 27 || 12 || 23.1 || 7.7 || .533 || .329 || .788 || 2.1 || 5.2 || .0 || .6 || 1.2
|-
| style="text-align:left;"| 2017–18
| style="text-align:left;" rowspan=2| Vanoli Cremona
| 30 || 7 || 21.4 || 5.0 || .500 || .380 || .824 || 2.4 || 3.7 || .0 || .9 || 1.2
|-
| style="text-align:left;"| 2018–19
| 29 || 20 || 24.8 || 9.1 || .545 || .383 || .788 || 2.1 || 3.7 || .0 || .9 || 1.4
|- class="sortbottom"
| style="text-align:left;"| Career
| style="text-align:left;"|
| 172 || 125 || 28.0 || 11.1 || .501 || .384 || .811 || 2.7 || 5.0 || .0 || 1.0 || 1.8

|-
| style="text-align:left;"| 2011
| style="text-align:left;" rowspan=4| Dinamo Sassari
| 2 || 2 || 20.5 || 3.0 || .167 || .250 || 1.000 || 2.0 || 4.0 || .0 || 1.0 || 1.0 
|-
| style="text-align:left;"| 2012
| 6 || 6 || 33.2 || 10.8 || .404 || .321 || .000 || 2.8 || 6.3 || .0 || .3 || 2.2
|-
| style="text-align:left;"| 2013
| 7 || 7 || 33.4 || 13.1 || .364 || .300 || .893 || 2.4 || 5.7 || .0 || 1.0 || 1.4
|-
| style="text-align:left;"| 2014
| 9 || 7 || 26.1 || 7.7 || .375 || .279 || .938 || 1.9 || 5.1 || .0 || .8 || 1.0
|-
| style="text-align:left;"| 2018
| style="text-align:left;" rowspan=2| Vanoli Cremona
| 3 || 0 || 22.7 || 9.3 || .875 || .429 || 1.000 || 2.0 || 2.7 || .0 || 1.0 || 2.0
|-
| style="text-align:left;"| 2019
| 9 || 9 || 25.1 || 9.2 || .469 || .444 || .714 || 2.1 || 4.1 || .0 || .3 || .4
|- class="sortbottom"
| style="text-align:left;"| Career
| style="text-align:left;"|
| 36 || 31 || 27.8 || 9.5 || .413 || .338 || .864 || 2.3 || 4.1 || .0 || .7 || 1.2

National team

Notes

External links

 Lega Basket Serie A Player Profile
 Travis Diener at FIBA EuroBasket 2013

1982 births
Living people
American expatriate basketball people in Italy
American men's basketball players
Basketball players from Wisconsin
Dinamo Sassari players
Indiana Pacers players
Lega Basket Serie A players
Marquette Golden Eagles men's basketball players
Orlando Magic draft picks
Orlando Magic players
Parade High School All-Americans (boys' basketball)
Point guards
Portland Trail Blazers players
Sportspeople from Fond du Lac, Wisconsin
Vanoli Cremona players
Naturalised citizens of Italy